Marshfield is a small unincorporated community in Steuben Township, Warren County, in the U.S. state of Indiana.

History 
The town of Marshfield was platted on May 22, 1857, and named for Marshfield, Massachusetts, the home of statesman Daniel Webster.  A post office was established on April 6, 1857, which operated until 1989. In 1870, the population was 150 and, by 1900, it had grown to 250. In the late 1800s, the town had a dry goods store, a hotel, three churches, three saloons, two blacksmith shops, a grain warehouse, a wagon and carriage manufactory, a grocery store, a drug store and three physicians.

In 2007, Marshfield consisted of a number of private residences, a grain elevator, a church and a body shop.

Geography 
A Norfolk Southern Railway line runs along the east side of town, from Danville, Illinois, in the southwest to Lafayette in the northeast; the line carries about 45 freight trains per day.

Demographics

References 

Unincorporated communities in Indiana
Unincorporated communities in Warren County, Indiana
Populated places established in 1857
1857 establishments in Indiana